USS Marcus (DD-321) was a  built for the United States Navy after World War I.

Namesake

Arnold Marcus was born on 26 June 1892 in Atlantic City, New Jersey. He was appointed a midshipman on 22 May 1909. He assumed command of the submarine  on 13 March 1917. On 27 July 1917, Lieutenant (junior grade) Marcus died from injuries suffered during an explosion on Shark, while the submarine was on patrol in Manila Bay, Philippine Islands. He was the last man to leave the ship, remaining on board to ensure the safe evacuation of his crew and to attempt the grounding of his ship to prevent sinking.

Description
The Clemson class was a repeat of the preceding  although more fuel capacity was added. They had a crew of 6 officers and 108 enlisted men.

Performance differed radically between the ships of the class, often due to poor workmanship. The Clemson class was powered by two steam turbines, each driving one propeller shaft, using steam provided by four water-tube boilers.

The ships were armed with four 4-inch (102 mm) guns in single mounts and were fitted with two  1-pounder guns for anti-aircraft defense. In many ships a shortage of 1-pounders caused them to be replaced by 3-inch (76 mm) guns. Their primary weapon, though, was their torpedo battery of a dozen 21 inch (533 mm) torpedo tubes in four triple mounts. They also carried a pair of depth charge rails. A "Y-gun" depth charge thrower was added to many ships.

Construction and career
Marcus, named for Arnold Marcus, was laid down 20 May 1919 by the Bethlehem Shipbuilding Corporation, San Francisco, California; launched 22 August 1919; sponsored by Mrs. Arnold Marcus, widow of Lieutenant (jg.) Marcus; and commissioned 23 February 1921.

Marcus, after completion of her shakedown cruise, was assigned to destroyer squadron duty with the Pacific Fleet. As a unit of Squadron 13, and later Squadron 12, she operated off the West Coast, her cruises ranging from Seattle, Washington to Panama. In early 1924, February–March, she joined other ships of the battle force in fleet maneuvers based on a simulated attack on the Panama Canal. From April through July 1925, she participated in fleet tactical problems in the Hawaiian Islands area. She then returned to her regular operations schedule until 1927. During March and April of that year she again sailed south to take part in Caribbean fleet maneuvers, following which she returned to the West Coast. Between 1927 and 1929, she made several voyages to Honolulu; one, a Naval Reserve training cruise, two others as carrier screen.

In September 1929, Marcus was ordered to San Diego, California where she decommissioned 31 May 1930. Disposed of in accordance with the terms of the London Naval Treaty, she was struck from the Navy list 28 January 1935 and sunk by gunfire 25 June 1935.

As of 2005, no other ships in the United States Navy have been named Marcus.

Notes

References

External links
Photo gallery at navsource.org
Photo gallery at Naval Historical Center

 

Clemson-class destroyers
Ships built in San Francisco
1919 ships
Maritime incidents in 1935
Ships sunk as targets
Shipwrecks of the California coast